Coleophora artemisicolella is a moth of the family Coleophoridae found in Europe  and across the Palearctic.

Description
The wingspan is 11–13 mm. Adults are on wing from July to August.

The larvae feed on mugwort (Artemisia vulgaris). The larvae form a case very closely resembling a seedhead, and moves from seed to seed leaving diagnostic small holes in the side of each one. Normally, the larvae feed on developing fruits, but might stray to the leaves.

Distribution
It is found from Fennoscandia to the Pyrenees, Italy, and Bulgaria, and from Great Britain to central and southern Russia, further east to Japan.

References

External links
 Swedish Moths

artemisicolella
Moths described in 1855
Moths of Asia
Moths of Europe
Taxa named by Charles Théophile Bruand d'Uzelle